Baoshan Iron & Steel Co., Ltd., also known as Baoshan Iron & Steel and Baosteel, is a maker of steel based in Shanghai, China, and a subsidiary of state-owned China Baowu Steel Group (formerly Baosteel Group). It is listed on the Shanghai Stock Exchange.

History

In 2000, the Baosteel Group split, creating the new Baoshan Iron & Steel Co., Ltd., which is listed on the Shanghai Stock Exchange since 12 December 2000. It was the largest initial public offering in Mainland China up to that time, raising CNY 7.7 billion despite being limited to domestic investors. It was rumoured that the company has planned to list in the Stock Exchange of Hong Kong in the same year. (and again in 2007) However, they were never materialized. Baoshan Iron & Steel's IPO record was broken by fellow government controlling listed company Sinopec in 2001. Nevertheless, Baoshan Iron & Steel also re-capitalize a few times to increase its share capital and market capitalization. For example, right after the IPO the share capital was CNY 12,512 million, as of 31 December 2019, it was CNY 22,274,460,375.

The major assets of the listed company at that time was the steel plant located in Shanghai.

However, even until today, not all of the assets of China Baowu Steel Group were injected into the listed company, for example steel plants that incorporated as Maanshan Iron & Steel Shaoguan Iron and Steel and Xinjiang Ba Yi Iron and Steel. Some of the assets were injected into another listed company Baosight Software in 2001. In 2004 Baoshan Iron & Steel Co., Ltd. acquired Baosight Software from the parent company. In the same year the listed company also attempted to acquire other assets from the parent, such as Meishan Iron & Steel, as well as the "special steel" production line of Shanghai Fifth Steel Plant. At that time, another unlisted sister company which has major connected transactions with the listed company, was Shanghai Baosteel International Economic & Trade Co. Ltd. ("Baosteel International" in short). Baosteel International became a wholly owned subsidiary of the listed company in 2005. A redistribution of the businesses of Baosteel International, to sister division and company took place in 2006.

In 2016, Baoshan Iron & Steel Co., Ltd. merged with Wuhan Iron and Steel Company Limited in an all-share deal.

Subsidiaries

Baoshan Iron & Steel owned 4 major steel plants that located in Shanghai, Nanjing (in Meishan Iron Mine), Zhanjiang and Wuhan. The latter three were incorporated as a limited companies. Baoshan Iron & Steel also owned another listed company Baosight Software (SSE:600845) as well as other subsidiaries and joint ventures.

Baosight Software
Baosight Software is a listed company that owned by Baoshan Iron & Steel Co., Ltd., which itself is a listed company since 2000. The shares of Baosight Software had started to trade on the Shanghai Stock Exchange since 11 March 1994 (B share since 15 March 1994) as Shanghai Steel Tube Co., Ltd.

In 2000 Baosteel Group, the parent company of Baoshan Iron & Steel Co., Ltd., acquired the controlling stake of Shanghai Steel Tube.

In 2001, as part of a backdoor listing, most of the assets of the listed company had swapped with a subsidiary of Baosteel Group. The company also renamed into Shanghai Baosight Software Co., Ltd.. The shares of company had resumed from trade suspension in 2002. At that time media criticized the company was heavily rely on intra-group (within Baosteel Group) business activities as revenue. As of 2019, the ratio of connected transaction has decreased to 23.74% of the sales revenue.

In 2004, Baosight Software was acquired by its sister company Baoshan Iron & Steel Co., Ltd.

Meishan Iron & Steel

In 2004, Baoshan Iron & Steel acquired Meishan Iron & Steel Co., Ltd. Despite located in Nanjing, Jiangsu Province, the steel plant was founded by Shanghai municipal government and merged with Baosteel Group in 1998.

In 2019, it was announced that the steel plant of Meishan Iron & Steel, would relocate to Yancheng, Jiangsu Province in the 2020s.

Zhanjiang Iron & Steel
In October 2012, Baosteel acquired the controlling stake in Zhanjiang Iron & Steel Co., Ltd. from the State-owned Assets Supervision and Administration Commission (SASAC) of the Guangzhou Municipal People's Government. After the capital increase as well as the withdrew of Guangzhou SASAC, the listed company owned 90% stake of Zhanjiang Iron & Steel.

The first phase of the steel plant that owned by Zhanjiang Iron & Steel, is completed in 2016.

Wuhan Iron & Steel

On 21–22 September 2016, a merger between Baosteel Group and Wuhan Iron and Steel Group (WISCO) was announced. Baoshan Iron & Steel would take over the listed counterpart from Wuhan Iron and Steel Group in an all-share deal, while all the rights of Wuhan Iron and Steel Group would be transferred to Baosteel Group, as both corporations were supervised by the Central Government's SASAC.

Unlike Baosteel, WISCO has a longer history which could be traced back to 1955. It was once considered as the top 3 steel plants of China, along with Ansteel Group and Baotou Steel. Before the merger, if counting both listed and unlisted portions of WISCO, it was the sixth largest steel company in China and 11th in the world as of 2015, according to World Steel Association and China Iron and Steel Association.

Equity investments
In 2002, Baosteel invested CNY 8 billion in the third pipeline of the West–East Gas Pipeline, acquiring a 12.8% stake (the pipe was incorporated as a limited company called ). In December 2015, a new company, PetroChina Pipelines, was formed to manage all three of the west–east pipelines, and existing share capital of the three management companies were converted into the share capital of the new company, giving Baosteel an overall 3.25% stake.

Shareholders
Since foundation, Baosteel Group (now called China Baowu Steel Group after a merger) is the controlling shareholder of the listed company. In turn it is owned by the Chinese Central Government. However, the ownership ratio changed from time to time.

In mid-2016, Baosteel Group and China National Petroleum Corporation, both overseen by the State-owned Assets Supervision and Administration Commission, formed a cross ownership arrangement for their listed subsidiaries. After the deal, Baosteel Group held a 0.34% stake in PetroChina, while China National Petroleum Corp. received a 4.86% stake in Baoshan Iron and Steel.

In December 2019, Baowu transferred a further 2.19% stake of the listed company to -owned Shougang Group. Immediately after the deal, Baowu's stake on the listed company decreased from 64.12% to 61.93%.

Markets
Baoshan Iron & Steel Co., Ltd. is a constituent of the CSI 300 pan-exchanges index. , it was also part of the subset, the CSI 100 Index.

The listed company was a constituent of the SSE 50 Index, the blue chip index of the Shanghai exchange. The shares was removed from the index in 2013 and re-instated in 2017. The company was removed from the index in December 2019. , the company is still a constituent of SSE 180 Index.

The company is ranked 323rd in 2020 edition of Forbes Global 2000.

References

External links
 

Steel companies of China
Companies listed on the Shanghai Stock Exchange
Companies in the CSI 100 Index
Manufacturing companies based in Shanghai
Chinese companies established in 2000
Baowu
Government-owned companies of China
2000 establishments in China